Nicanor Stigmatias (Nīkā́nōr Stigmatíās) was a celebrated grammarian, who lived during the reign of the Roman emperor Hadrian in the early 2nd century AD.

According to the Suda he came from Alexandria; according to Stephanus of Byzantium he came from Hierapolis.

According to the Suda, he acquired the joking nickname Stigmatias (στιγματίας, "punctuated" but also "tattooed") because his labours were principally directed to punctuation. From his having devoted much of his attention to the elucidation of Homer's epics through punctuation, Stephanus also calls him "the new Homer", ὁ νέος Ὅμηρος.

He wrote also on the punctuation of Callimachus; and a work On punctuation in general (περὶ καθόλου στιγμῆς).

He is copiously quoted in the Venetus A scholia on the Homeric Iliad.

(Fabricius Bibl. Graec. i.368, 517, iii.823, vi.345.)

Editions
 Scholia on the Iliad:Erbse, H. 1969–88, Scholia Graeca in Homeri Iliadem, 7 vols. (Berlin)
 Nicanor's work reconstructed from the Iliad scholia:Friedländer, L. 1967 [1850], Nicanoris περὶ Ἰλιακῆς στιγμῆς: reliquiae emendatiores, 2nd ed. (Amsterdam)

See also
 Homeric scholarship

References

 

Ancient Greek grammarians
Homeric scholars
Roman-era Alexandrians
2nd-century Egyptian people
2nd-century writers
Year of birth unknown
Year of death unknown